Alexander Erskine may refer to:

Sir Alexander Erskine-Hill, 1st Baronet
Sir Alexander Erskine of Gogar, keeper of James VI (1572–1578)
Alexander Erskine, 3rd Earl of Kellie
Sir Alexander Erskine of Cambo bt. (c. 1663–1727), Lord Lyon King of Arms

See also
Erskine (surname)